Sergiu Toma (born 29 January 1987) is a Moldovan-born Emirati judoka. He competed for the United Arab Emirates in the 81 kg category at the 2016 Olympic Games and defeated Takanori Nagase to enter the semi-finals. He lost his semi-final match to Khasan Khalmurzaev, but then beat Matteo Marconcini in the bronze medal match. At the 2008 and 2012 Olympics he competed for Moldova but was eliminated in the early rounds.

Toma has a law degree from the Moldova State University. In 2008, he considered retiring from sport due to financial problems. He stayed, and in 2011 was named Moldovan Athlete of the Year. After the 2012 Olympics he moved to the United Arab Emirates, together with five other Moldovan judoka and the national coach Vasile Colta.

References

External links

 
 

1987 births
Living people
Emirati male judoka
Moldovan male judoka
Olympic judoka of Moldova
Olympic judoka of the United Arab Emirates
Judoka at the 2008 Summer Olympics
Judoka at the 2012 Summer Olympics
Judoka at the 2016 Summer Olympics
Medalists at the 2016 Summer Olympics
Sportspeople from Chișinău
Olympic bronze medalists for the United Arab Emirates
Olympic medalists in judo
Universiade medalists in judo
Judoka at the 2018 Asian Games
Universiade bronze medalists for Moldova
Asian Games competitors for the United Arab Emirates
Medalists at the 2007 Summer Universiade